Brothers is the fourth studio album by the American country music duo LoCash. It was released on March 29, 2019 via Wheelhouse Records, a division of Broken Bow Records. The album includes the singles "Feels Like a Party" and "One Big Country Song."

Content
Preston Brust and Chris Lucas, who comprise LoCash, announced the album in February 2019. The lead single, "Feels Like a Party", was sent to radio in late 2018. The duo said that the album reflects their dependence on each other throughout their careers, with Sounds Like Nashville writer Lauren Laffer saying that it "will consist of upbeat feel-good songs and have an overall neighborly sentiment." Brust and Lucas wrote some of the songs on the album, with other writers including Russell Dickerson, Rhett Akins, and Devin Dawson's twin brother Jacob Durrett. Tyler Hubbard, one-half of Florida Georgia Line, produced the album with Lindsay Rimes, Corey Crowder, and Jordan Schmidt.

Commercial performance
The album debuted at No. 34 on Billboard's Top Country Albums, selling 3,800 copies in the first week.

Track listing

Charts

References

2019 albums
LoCash albums
BBR Music Group albums